Slade Blackwell (born June 14, 1968) is an American Republican politician and businessman who served as a member of the Alabama Senate from 2010 to 2018.

Early life and education 
He was born in Mississippi and grew up in Montevallo, Alabama. He received a Bachelor of Science in Commercial Design and Business from the University of Montevallo on a basketball scholarship.

Career 
After graduating from college, Blackwell worked for Colonial Properties and started his own small business, Inkana Development, in 1996.

He is a member of the Birmingham Business Alliance, Mountain Brook and Greater Shelby County Chambers of Commerce, the Alabama Republican Party, and a board member of Birmingham Golf Association.

Blackwell attended Enon Baptist Church in Calera, Alabama as a child. He now attends Covenant Presbyterian Church in Homewood, Alabama. He is married to his high school sweetheart, and they have three children.

References

1968 births
21st-century American politicians
American Presbyterians
Republican Party Alabama state senators
Baptists from Alabama
Living people
People from Calera, Alabama
People from Montevallo, Alabama
People from Mountain Brook, Alabama
University of Montevallo alumni